Enrique Enríquez may refer to:
Enrique Enríquez the Elder (c. 1246–before 28 February 1323), nobleman of Castile
Enrique Enríquez the Younger (d. 1366), nobleman of Castile
Enrico Enríquez (1701–1756),  Italian Roman Catholic cardinal